Vertigo Bird is a Slovenian brand that designs and manufactures lighting products. It consists of several design companies and an individual group of designers created by the company founder himself, called Smoke Detektors. The brand started as part of a Slovene international lighting company, Arcadia Lightwear, founded in 1989 by Silvo Kačar. Around 2010 Vertigo Bird became its own company located in Ljubljana, Slovenia. In 2022 brand was bought by Rona trgovina d.o.o., lighting distribution company from Kranj, Slovenia. Under the new ownership it is now undergoing a huge digital and technical transformation.

The brand's most recognizable motif and also its official logo, the angel, represents the company's motto: "Unpredictably elegant + unexpectedly functional."

In 2008, the light LUC by Arne Vehovar was nominated for BIO, the Biennial of Industrial Design. In 2009, the light SLIM by Bevk Perovic arhitekti won the Red Dot Award: Product Design 2009.

Lighting brands
Slovenian brands
Design companies of Slovenia